Emma Isaacs is an Australian entrepreneur. She is the owner and Global CEO of Business Chicks, Australia's business women's community.

Career 
Isaacs was 18 when she bought her first business, a recruitment company called Staff It. When she was 25, she went to her first Business Chicks event and later bought the business. Under Isaacs' direction, Business Chicks has hosted speakers including Sir Richard Branson, Nicole Kidman, Jamie Oliver, Bob Geldof and Arianna Huffington.

When Isaacs first bought Business Chicks she thought that the networking group would be a side job to her recruitment agency. It was from this, that Business Chicks has become a large business community for women in Australia. With over 44000 members, Business Chicks is one of the only networks of its kind in Australia, hosting regular events that strive to empower women.

Isaacs was previously the president of the Sydney chapter of Entrepreneurs' Organisation. She has also sat on the board for The Hunger Project. Isaacs now writes a column for the Business Chicks magazine.

In August 2018, she was interviewed by Radio National's Life Matters program about risk-taking.

Book 

 Winging it, Macmillan by Pan Macmillan Australia, 2018

Honours 

Telstra Business Women's Awards in 2015.
Isaacs named one of Australia's nine most influential female entrepreneurs by Sydney Morning Herald in 2016.

Personal life 
Isaacs is married and has six children. She currently resides in Los Angeles.

References

External links 
 Business Chicks blog

Living people
Australian businesspeople
Year of birth missing (living people)